Ronald Launcelot Squire (25 March 1886 – 16 November 1958) was an English character actor.

Biography
Born in Tiverton, Devon, England, the son of an army officer, Lt.-Col. Frederick Squirl and his Irish-born wife Mary (Ronald's surname 'Squire' was his stage name), he attended Wellington College and started professional life as a journalist, before training at RADA. He spent his early acting career in Liverpool repertory theatre in light comedy roles, before moving on to films. His appearances include The Rocking Horse Winner, The Million Pound Note and Mike Todd's lavish 1956 version of Around the World in 80 Days. He died 16 November 1958 aged 72, after being taken ill at his home in Great Ormond Street, London. 

He made numerous appearances in West End plays alongside his film career. These included performances in On Approval, The Bread-Winner, All Rights Reserved, Ducks and Drakes, While the Sun Shines, Jane, The Way Things Go, The Iron Duchess, A Penny for a Song and A Touch of the Sun.

Partial filmography

 Whoso Is Without Sin (1916) - Roger Markham
 Unfinished Symphony (1934) - Count Esterhazy
 Forbidden Territory (1934) - Sir Charles Farringdon
 Wild Boy (1934) - Rollo
 Come Out of the Pantry (1935) - Eccles
 Love in Exile (1936) - Paul
 Dusty Ermine (1936) - Jim Kent
 Action for Slander (1938) - Charles Cinderford
 Freedom Radio (1941) - Rudolf Spiedler
 The Flemish Farm (1943) - Hardwicke
 Don't Take It to Heart (1944) - Music Lover at Ball
 Journey Together (1945) - Group Captain on Aircrew Interview Board
 While the Sun Shines (1947) - Duke of Ayr and Sterling
 The First Gentleman (1948) - Mr. Brougham
 Woman Hater (1948) - Jameson
 The Rocking Horse Winner (1949) - Oscar Cresswell
 No Highway in the Sky (1951) - Sir John, Director
 Encore (1951) - Doctor (segment "Winter Cruise")
 It Started in Paradise (1952) - Mary Jane
 My Cousin Rachel (1952) - Nicholas Kendall
 Laxdale Hall (1953) - General Matheson
 Always a Bride (1953) - Victor Hemsley
 The Million Pound Note (1954) - Oliver Montpelier 
 The Man Who Loved Redheads (1955) - Wilberforce (uncredited)
 Raising a Riot (1955) - Grampy
 Footsteps in the Fog (1955) - Alfred Travers
 Josephine and Men (1955) - Frederick Luton
 Now and Forever (1956) - Waiter
 The Silken Affair (1956) - Marberry
 Around the World in 80 Days (1956) - Reform Club Member #1
 Sea Wife (1957) - Clubman
 Island in the Sun (1957) - Governor Templeton
 Law and Disorder (1958) - Colonel Masters
 The Sheriff of Fractured Jaw (1958) - Toynbee - His Solicitor
 The Inn of the Sixth Happiness (1958) - Sir Francis Jamison
 Count Your Blessings (1959) - Sir Conrad Allingham (final film role)

References

External links
   Stage performances in the Theatre Archive, University of Bristol

1886 births
1958 deaths
English male film actors
English male stage actors
People from Tiverton, Devon
Male actors from Devon
20th-century English male actors